XCF may refer to:
XCF (file format), file format of the Gimp image editing computer program
IBM XCF, a component of the z/OS operating system
The eXperimental Computing Facility at the UC Berkeley
Exploratory Cask Finish (XCF), special whiskey bottlings by the Willett Distillery